Statistics of Armenian Premier League in the 1993 season.

 FC Ararat from the town of Ararat were promoted and changed their name to Tsement. 
 Kilikia FC merged with FC Malatia to form Malatia-Kilikia Yerevan. 
 Nairi SC were renamed Nairit FC.
 Shengavit FC of Yerevan withdrew from the league and the premier league license was granted to Yerazank FC who were relocated from Stepanakert to Yerevan.։

Teams

League table

Results

Top goalscorers

See also
 1993 in Armenian football
 1993 Armenian First League
 1993 Armenian Cup

References

Armenian Premier League seasons
1
Armenia
Armenia